Tytthoscincus sibuensis, the Sibu Island forest skink, is a species of skink. It is endemic to Sibu Island in Malaysia.

References

sibuensis
Endemic fauna of Malaysia
Reptiles of Malaysia
Reptiles described in 2006
Taxa named by Larry Lee Grismer